Alnus formosana, the Formosan alder, is a species of alder endemic to Taiwan.

Description 
The formosan alder is a trees up to 20 meters in height with dark gray-brown bark. The petiole is 1.2-2.2 cm, slender; leaves elliptic or oblong-lanceolate, rarely ovate-oblong, 6-12 × 2–5 cm, hairy in the axils of lateral veins beneath, almost hairless above, rounded or broadly cuneate base, irregularly minutely serrated margin, acuminate or acute apex; lateral veins 6 or 7 on each side of the midrib. It has one female inflorescence, or 2-4 in a cluster, ellipsoid, 1-2.5 cm; peduncle 3–5 mm.

Distribution and habitat 
It is found in Taiwan. It is commonly found in disturbed habitats as a pioneer species.

Ecology 
Alnus formosana flowers between May–June, fruiting between July–September.

Uses 
This tree is used for soil improvement. It also finds use in gardens and as a windbreak. The tree trunks is also used in paper pulping and cultivating snow fungus and shiitake.

The Atayal people uses A. formosana as a cover crop after clearing a new field, the traditional wisdom being that the soil becomes rich when it is cut cleared again in 10 to 15 years. It is also used in the Pas-ta'ai ritual of the Saisiyat people.

Early Han settlers of Taiwan name some places after the occurrence of the plant, the belief being that its occurrence is linked to ground collapse.

References

formosana
Endemic flora of Taiwan
Trees of Taiwan
Plants described in 1899